Caucasia is a 2007 Azerbaijani film directed by Farid Gumbatov. It was Azerbaijan's submission to the 80th Academy Awards for the Academy Award for Best Foreign Language Film, but was not accepted as a nominee.

See also

Cinema of Azerbaijan
List of submissions to the 80th Academy Awards for Best Foreign Language Film

References

External links

2007 films
2007 drama films
2000s Russian-language films
Azerbaijani-language films
Russian drama films
Azerbaijani drama films